List of Registered Historic Places in New Bedford, Massachusetts.

|}

Former listings

|}

See also

List of National Historic Landmarks in Massachusetts

References

New Bedford, Massachusetts
New Bedford
New Bedford, Massachusetts